India Partners is a U.S. non-governmental organization that partners with indigenous managed charities in India on projects to help the poor.

Information
India Partners has been operating since 1972. The organization is founded in Eugene, Oregon. It is a member of the Combined Federal Campaign and Evangelical Council for Financial Accountability. It is based on Christian grassroots movements and agencies. India Partners also directs volunteer teams, speakers, and sponsorship programs. The organizations focuses on certain areas such as partnerships, children, women, being self-sufficient, ministry of Jesus, disaster relief, and medical health. India Partners has received assistance and partnered with various groups over the years to make their work possible. India Partners generates about $917,613 in revenue.

Staff
The President and CEO of India Partners is John Sparks. The director of operations with this organization is Deen Rees, and he received his Bachelor of Science in finance from the University of Oregon. Kay Fiedler is the regional representative, and she attended Oregon State University and Linfield College.

References

External links
ReliefWeb
Partners
Plu.Edu

Social welfare charities based in the United States
India-focused charities
Organizations established in 1972
1972 establishments in Oregon